Camille Angela Cortez-Viernes Wilson (born December 2, 1995) is a footballer who plays as a midfielder. Born in the United States, she represents the Philippines women's national team.

Early life
Wilson was born on December 2, 1995 in the United States. Both of her parents were born in the Philippines who later emigrated to the United States. Wilson was inspired to take up football from her older brother Mark.

Education
Wilson attended Marin Catholic High School in Kentfield, California. She studied at the University of San Francisco for college.

Club career

Youth
Wilson started playing football at age four and joined Novato's local football house league for three years. She later joined the Novato United under-10 team at age eight. At age thirteen, Wilson joined Marin F.C. and played for the California (North) Olympic Development Program (ODP) State team for two years.

Wilson played as a midfielder for her high school team, the Marin Catholic Wildcats and as a striker for her club, Marin F.C.

International career
Wilson tried out for the Philippine national team when the national side set up a recruiting camp in November 2012 and March 2013 in Southern California. Wilson was among the youngest players to try out for the team. She managed to earn a spot and made her first non-FIFA international appearance at the LA Vikings Cup for the Philippine national team. She attended subsequent training camps in Southern California and was selected to represent the Philippines in the AFC Women’s Asian Cup qualifiers in Bangladesh in May 2013 which served as qualifiers for the 2015 Women’s World Cup. She scored her first goal in the 2013 AFF Women's Championship vs Indonesia at the 51st minute, Malditas won the game, 6-0. Wilson was in the reserve pool of the PWNT during AFC Women's Asian Cup hosted by India in January-February 2022. The Malditas earned their very first berth to FIFA World Cup 2023 following their successful run during the tournament placing third place, together with Japan, overall.

Career statistics

International goals
Scores and results list the Philippines' goal tally first.

References

1995 births
Living people
Citizens of the Philippines through descent
Filipino women's footballers
Women's association football midfielders
Women's association football forwards
Philippines women's international footballers
Sportspeople from West Covina, California
Soccer players from California
American women's soccer players
San Francisco Dons women's soccer players
American sportspeople of Filipino descent